Brazil competed at the 1964 Summer Olympics in Tokyo, Japan. 61 competitors, 60 men and 1 woman, took part in 17 events in 11 sports. The country single medal in 1964 was the bronze obtained by the men's basketball team.

Medalists

Athletics

Women
Field events

Basketball

Preliminary round

Group B

Semifinals

Bronze medal match

Boxing

Men

Equestrian

Show jumping

Football

First round

Group C

Judo

Men

Modern pentathlon

One male pentathlete represented Brazil in 1964.
Men

Sailing

Open

Swimming

Men

Volleyball

Round robin

|}

|}

Team Roster
 João Cláudio França
 José da Costa
 Hamilton de Oliveira
 Emanuel Newdon
 Feitosa
 Marco Antônio Volpi
 Carlos Arthur Nuzman
 José Ramalho
 Décio de Azevedo
 Victor Barcellos Borges
 Giuseppe Mezzasalma 
 Pedro Barbosa de Oliveira
Head coach: Samy Mehlinski

Water polo

Preliminary round

Group C

|}

References

External links
Official Olympic Reports
International Olympic Committee results database

Nations at the 1964 Summer Olympics
1964
Olympics